The Ohio State Buckeyes baseball team is the college baseball team of Ohio State University. The program, founded in 1881, was the first athletic team in Ohio State history. Bill Davis Stadium in Columbus, Ohio, has been the home field of the program since 1997. The team won a National Title in 1966, and also 14 Big Ten Titles throughout the team's history. It is currently coached by Bill Mosiello. Ohio State has produced many professional baseball players, such as major leaguers Steve Arlin, Frank Howard, Nick Swisher, Barry Bonnell, Dave Burba, and Fred Taylor.

History

Ohio State played its first season in 1881, as the first-ever organized sport at OSU. Ohio State was undefeated, only playing one game and winning against Capital 8–5. From there baseball in Columbus took off as OSU won the Ohio title several more times.

Stadium
Ohio State currently plays at Bill Davis Stadium. From 1967 to 1997 the Buckeyes played at Trautman Field.  In 2011, the playing field was named after former Buckeye and Major League Baseball All-Star and World Series Champion Nick Swisher, thus the official name of the Buckeye's home is Nick Swisher Field at Bill Davis Stadium.

Head coaches

Ohio State in the NCAA tournament
The NCAA Division I baseball tournament started in 1947.
The format of the tournament has changed through the years.

Note:  In 1951, Ohio State participated in the district playoffs, which it won, and moved on to the College World Series.  Prior to 1954, district playoff games were not considered a part of the National Collegiate Baseball Championship, and thus are not counted in Ohio State's NCAA tournament record.

All-Americans
 
Ronnie Bourquin (2006)
Scott Lewis (2003)
Justin Fry (1999)
EJ Laratta (1999)
Matt Beaumont (1994)
Ray Shoup (1967)
Steve Arlin (1965, 1966)
Tom Perdue (1966)
Paul Ebert (1954)
Stewart Hein (1951)
Fred Taylor (1950)

Terry Greer (1977) catcher
Arnie Chonko (1965)

Retired numbers 

Notes

See also
 List of NCAA Division I baseball programs

References

External links